The Bücker Bü 180 Student was a 1930s German two-seat sporting/training aircraft built by Bücker Flugzeugbau.

Development
In January 1937 Major Werner Junck, chief of the LC II, the technical wing of the Reichsluftfahrtministerium responsible for the development of new aircraft, informed various minor aircraft manufacturers such as Bücker, Fieseler, Gothaer Waggonfabrik, Flugzeugwerke Halle and Klemm that they would not get any contracts for the development of military aircraft. He therefore advised them to concentrate in the development of a Volksflugzeug or a small twin-engined plane.
Following on from the success of the Bü 133 Jungmeister the Bücker company designed the Bü 180, while the other companies produced the Fi 253, the Si 202, the Kl 105 and the Go 150.

It was a low-wing cantilever monoplane that would be later used as a trainer aircraft and named Student. The wing was of wooden construction with a mixture of plywood and fabric covering.  The fuselage was a steel tube frame forward and a wooden monocoque aft with a fabric covering. 
The Student had a fixed tailskid landing gear and was powered by a Walter Mikron II inline engine.  The prototype first flew in 1937 and a small number were built for civilian use.

Variants

Bü 180A
Production variant with a  Zündapp Z9-092 engine.
Bü 180B
Production variant with a  Walter Mikron II engine.
Bü 180C
Proposed variant with an  Bücker Bü M700 engine.

Specifications (Bü 180B)

See also

References

Notes

Bibliography

 Donald, David (editor). The Encyclopedia of World Aircraft. Leicester, UK:Blitz, 1997. .
 König, Erwin. Bücker Bü 180 "Student", Bü 182 "Kornett", Bü 134: Drei geniale Flugzeugtypen, die dem Krieg zum Opfer fielen (Flugzeug Profile 36) (in German). D-86669 Stengelheim, Germany: Unitec Medienvertrieb e.K., 
 König, Erwin. Die Bücker-Flugzeuge (The Bücker Aircraft) (bilingual German/English). Martinsried, Germany: Nara Verlag, 1987. .
 König, Erwin. Die Bückers, Die Geschichte der ehemaligen Bücker-Flugzeugbau-GmbH und ihrer Flugzeuge (in German). (1979)
 Wietstruk, Siegfried. Bücker-Flugzeugbau, Die Geschichte eines Flugzeugwerkes (in German). D-82041 Oberhaching, Germany: Aviatik Verlag, 1999. .

Low-wing aircraft
Single-engined tractor aircraft
1930s German sport aircraft
Bücker aircraft
Aircraft first flown in 1937